Mervin Manufacturing is an American snowboard manufacturer. Mervin is the parent company of Lib Technologies (aka Lib Tech), GNU Snowboards, Roxy Snowboards, and Bent Metal bindings. In the mid 1990s Mervin was also an OEM supplier for companies such as Canada's Luxury brand and for The Movement Snowboards.

Mervin was purchased by Quiksilver in the late 1990s. , Mervin was purchased by Altamont Capital.

External links 
 
 Lib Technologies Snowboards website
 GNU Snowboards website
  Roxy Snowboards website

Manufacturing companies based in Seattle
Snowboarding companies